The 1994 Notre Dame Fighting Irish football team represented the University of Notre Dame in the 1994 NCAA Division I-A football season. The team was coached by Lou Holtz and played its home games at Notre Dame Stadium in South Bend, Indiana.

Rivalries
 In the Holy War match against Boston College, BC beat Notre Dame to claim the Frank Leahy Memorial Bowl.
 Notre Dame beat Michigan State to claim the Megaphone Trophy.
 Notre Dame beat Purdue to claim the Shillelagh Trophy.
 Notre Dame lost to Michigan.

Schedule

Roster

Game summaries

Northwestern

Michigan

USC

Fiesta Bowl

Awards and honors
 Former Fighting Irish player Jerry Groom and former coach Jesse Harper were inducted into the College Football Hall of Fame

Team players in the NFL

References

Notre Dame
Notre Dame Fighting Irish football seasons
Notre Dame Fighting Irish football